"Pretty Little Baby" is a 1965 single released by soul singer Marvin Gaye on the Tamla label.

Co-written by Gaye, Clarence Paul and David Hamilton and produced by Paul, the song described the narrator's longing and pleading to his woman to not leave his side after the two had an argument.

The song was originally written and recorded as a psychedelic holiday song called Purple Snowflakes. This version was eventually shelved and would not be released until 1992, when it was released on the Motown Christmas compilation Christmas In the City.

The song was Marvin's second Top 40 single of 1965 after the success of his first number-one Billboard hit, "I'll Be Doggone".

A non-album track until the release of his Anthology album nearly ten years later, this song was a top forty success for Gaye peaking at number sixteen on the R&B chart and number twenty-five pop.  Cash Box described it as "a lyrical, chorus-backed funky romancer soulfully rendered by the songster."

Personnel
Lead vocals by Marvin Gaye
Background vocals by The Andantes
Instrumentation by The Funk Brothers

References

1965 singles
Marvin Gaye songs
Songs written by Marvin Gaye
Songs written by Clarence Paul
1965 songs
Tamla Records singles